Lamerd County is in Fars province, Iran. The capital of the county is the city of Lamerd. At the 2006 census, the county's population was 76,971 in 16,602 households. The following census in 2011 counted 83,916 people in 21,210 households. At the 2016 census, the county's population was 91,782 in 25,837 households.

Lamerd was historically part of the region of Irahistan. The people of Lamerd are closely related to the Achomi people.

Administrative divisions

The population history and structural changes of Lamerd County's administrative divisions over three consecutive censuses are shown in the following table. The latest census shows four districts, eight rural districts, and four cities.

References

 

Counties of Fars Province